Image of the Beast may refer to:

Image of the Beast (antichrist) 
Image of the Beast (novel)
Image of the Beast (film)